Olkash (also known as Alenkash and Ulkash) is a village in Shal Rural District, Shahrud District, Khalkhal County, Ardabil Province, Iran. At the 2006 census, its population was 92, in 18 families.

References 

Towns and villages in Khalkhal County